Casebook is an Australian educational documentary series produced by the 7 Network from 1966-1968. It was made with the co operation of the Australian Medical Association. Each episode usually contained 2-3 segments relating to medical advice given by a real doctor (Dr John) to patients (played by professional actors) suffering from a variety of illnesses.

One of the directors was David Cahill.

External links
Casebook at National Film and Sound Archive

1960s Australian documentary television series
Australian educational television series
1966 Australian television series debuts
1968 Australian television series endings